

Events

Year overall
 The independent publishing boom continues, as Antarctic Press, Continuity Comics, Deluxe Comics, Matrix Graphic Series, and Renegade Press all enter the arena. 
Small press publisher Americomics changes its name to AC Comics.
 Terry Nantier teams up with Chris Beall and Marc Minoustchine to form Nantier, Beall, Minoustchine (NBM Publishing). 
 The ups-and-downs of the marketplace take their toll, as Gold Key Comics (also known as Whitman Comics), Capital Comics, JC Comics, Pacific Comics, and Spectrum Comics all cease publishing.
 The Marvel Comics imprint Epic Comics releases four new limited series (Six from Sirius, Timespirits, Crash Ryan, and The Sisterhood of Steel), solidifying the new publishing trend.
 Marvel Comics introduces its Star Comics imprint, licensed titles intended for young readers, with the three-issue limited series The Muppets Take Manhattan.
 Opening of the San Francisco-based Cartoon Art Museum.

January
 British writer Alan Moore takes over Swamp Thing at issue #20, a run which would turn the title around and set the foundations for Moore's career in American comics.
"The Kid Who Collects Spider-Man," written by Roger Stern, with art by Ron Frenz and Terry Austin is published in The Amazing Spider-Man #248. (The story is later selected as one of the "Top 10 Spider-Man stories of all time" by Wizard magazine.)
 Shield-Steel Sterling, with issue #4, is re-titled Steel Sterling. (Red Circle Comics)

February 
 World's Finest Comics #300: 52-page anniversary issue. (DC Comics)
 Nathaniel Dusk — #1 in a four-issue mini-series, by Don McGregor and Gene Colan, published by DC Comics.
 Archie Comics changes the name of its Red Circle Comics superhero imprint to Archie Adventure Series.

March
 March 19: Bill Holbrook's On the Fastrack makes its debut. 
 March 24: Scream! #1, published by IPC Magazines.

April 
 April 8: The final episode of Stuart Hample's celebrity comic Inside Woody Allen is published in papers.
 New Teen Titans, with issue #41, becomes Tales of the Teen Titans. (DC Comics)
 Fantastic Four #265 — She-Hulk joins the Fantastic Four as a result of the Secret Wars

May
Teenage Mutant Ninja Turtles, published by Mirage Studios, premiers at a comic book convention in Portsmouth, New Hampshire. Originally conceived by Kevin Eastman and Peter Laird as a one-off parody, the comic's popularity goes on to inspire four television series, numerous video games, five feature films, and a wide range of toys and merchandise.
Marvel Super Heroes Secret Wars debuts, written by Jim Shooter and published by Marvel Comics. Secret Wars is the first of a new breed of large crossover events which will become a staple of both Marvel and DC Comics publishing schedules from this point forward.
Spider-Man's black costume first appears in The Amazing Spider-Man #252, after the character returns from the Secret Wars. The black costume eventually ties into the origin of the popular supervillain Venom.
 Savage Sword of Conan #100: "When a God Lives," by Michael Fleisher, John Buscema, and Ernie Chan.
 Capital Comics suspends publication; its titles Badger, Nexus, and Whisper are later acquired by First Comics.
 Al Jaffee starts drawing the long-running comic The Shpy for The Moshiach Times. Dave Berg draws The Right Thing.

June
 June 7: Jean van Hamme and William Vance's XIII makes its debut.
 Mister X #1, by Jaime, Gilbert, and Mario Hernandez, is published by Vortex Comics.
 Batman Special #1, Batman battles The Wrath, by Mike W. Barr and Michael Golden, published by DC.
The Fury of Firestorm #24 features an insert previewing the upcoming Blue Devil series by writers Dan Mishkin and Gary Cohn and artist Paris Cullins.
 June 23: With issue #689, the British girls' comic Tammy ends its run, merging with Girl.
 June 30: Scream!, with issue #15, ends its run and merges with Eagle.  (IPC Magazines)

July 
 Six from Sirius — #1 in a four-issue mini-series, by Doug Moench and Paul Gulacy, published by Epic Comics.
 Steel Sterling, with issue #7, is cancelled by Archie Adventure Series.

August 
 Legion of Super-Heroes, with issue #314, becomes Tales of the Legion of Super-Heroes. (DC Comics)

September 
 September 22: The first episode of the gag comic Rasher, a spin-off of Dennis the Menace and Gnasher, is published in The Beano, drawn by David Sutherland. 
 Pacific Comics goes into liquidation. 
 Jemm, Son of Saturn — #1 in a 12-issue limited series, by Greg Potter, Gene Colan and Klaus Janson, published by DC Comics.
 The Mighty World of Marvel vol. 2, with issue #17, is cancelled by Marvel UK.
 Haunted, with issue #75, cancelled by Charlton.

October
 Superman #400: 68-page anniversary issue: "The Living Legends of Superman." (DC Comics)
 The Incredible Hulk #300: "Days of Rage!" by Bill Mantlo and Sal Buscema. (Marvel Comics)
 What If, with issue #47, is cancelled by Marvel.
The West Coast Avengers — #1 in a four-issue mini-series, published by Marvel Comics. Writer: Roger Stern. Artists: Bob Hall and Brett Breeding.
 Timespirits — #1 in an eight-issue limited series, published by Epic Comics.
 Crash Ryan — #1 in a four-issue mini-series, published by Epic Comics.
 Original Shield, with issue #4, is cancelled by Archie Adventure Series.
 Ghostly Tales, with issue #169, cancelled by Charlton Comics.
 Scary Tales, with issue #46, cancelled by Charlton Comics.

November
 November 1: The first episode of Leigh Rubin's Rubes appears in print.
 November 6: In Amsterdam the Dutch comics store Lambiek publishes a special Yiddish edition of Will Eisner's A Contract with God in the presence of Eisner himself.
 November 24: The Judge Dredd story "City of the Damned" begins its run in 2000 AD (the storyline runs through February 23, 1985).
 Wally Wood's T.H.U.N.D.E.R. Agents #1, published by Deluxe Comics, a revival of a superhero team originally published by Tower Comics until the late 1960s. The five published issues of this title feature some of the best artists of the era, including George Pérez, Dave Cockrum, Keith Giffen, Murphy Anderson, and Jerry Ordway.
 Kitty Pryde and Wolverine #1 in a six-issue mini-series, by Chris Claremont and Al Milgrom, published by Marvel Comics.
 The Muppets Take Manhattan #1 in a three-issue limited series, by Stan Kay, Dean Yeagle, and Jacqueline Roettcher, published by Star Comics.
 With issue #273, DC cancels Blackhawk volume 1, which ran from 1944 to 1968, 1976 to 1977, and was revived for the final time in 1982.
 Ghost Manor (vol. 2), with issue #77, cancelled by Charlton.

December
 Captain America #300: "Cap vs. The Red Skull — To the Death!" by J. M. DeMatteis, Paul Neary, and Dennis Janke.
 The Sisterhood of Steel — #1 in an eight-issue limited series, published by Epic Comics.
 Iceman — #1 in a four-issue limited series by J.M. DeMatteis, Alan Kupperberg, and Mike Gustovich; published by Marvel Comics.
 Blue Ribbon Comics, with issue #14, is cancelled by Archie Adventure Series.
 December 3: With issue #2103, Fleetway publishes the final issue of War Picture Library.
 December 3: The first chapter of Dragon Ball is published by Shueisha and Shōnen Jump.

Specific date unknown
 Piet Wijn wins the Stripschapprijs. The comics magazine Wordt Vervolgd is given the Jaarprijs voor Bijzondere Verdiensten (nowadays the P. Hans Frankfurtherprijs).
 Charles M. Schulz' Peanuts enters the Guinness Book of Records as the most widespread comic on Earth, appearing in 2.600 newspapers.

Deaths

January
 January 13: Ray Moore, American comics artist (co-creator of The Phantom), dies at age 78 or 79.
 January 15: Tom Hickey, American illustrator and comics artist (Slapsie, worked for DC Comics, Dell Comics,  Harvey Comics), dies at age 73.
 January 21: Phil Seuling, American organizer (founder of Comic Art Convention and Sea Gate Distributors) and voice actor (voice of one of the pig cops in Fritz the Cat), dies at age 50. 
 January 31: K-Hito, Spanish caricaturist, animator, sports journalist, film producer, publisher and comics writer and artist (Gutiérrez, Macaco, Currinche, Don Turulato), dies at age 93 or 94.

February
 February 23: Jorge B. Gálvez, aka Jordi Badía Romero, Spanish comics artist (The Super Cats), dies at age 45.

March 
 March 1: Carl Burgos, American comics artist (Human Torch), dies at age 67.
 March 15: Joseph Hughes Newton, American comics artist (Tullus), passes away at age 78.

April
 April 1: 
 Ray Gill, American comics writer and artist (worked for Timely Comics and Archie Comics), dies at age 66.
 Kurt Klamann, German painter and comics artist, dies at age 76.
 April 7: Vittorio Cossio, Italian comics artist and animator (continued Furio Almirante, Raff), dies at age 72 or 73.
 April 9: Lex Overeijnder, Dutch comics artist (continued Pinkie Pienter, created comic strip based on the TV show Fabeltjeskrant), passes away at age 53.

May 
 May 2: Bob Clampett, American animator, puppeteer and cartoonist (Porky Pig, Daffy Duck, Tweety), dies at the age of 70.
 May 7: Robert Giordan, French comics artist and half of the Giordan Brothers (Franck Nevil, Tom Tempest, Les Francis, Bob Corton, Vigor and Thierry), dies at age 61.
 May 21: Ruben Moreira, Puerto Rican-American comics artist (Tarzan), dies at age 61.
 May 22: Alan Maver, American sports cartoonist and comic artist (assisted on Nancy), dies at age 74. 
 Specific date unknown: May: Al Hubbard, American animator and comics artist (Disney comics, Tom & Jerry comics, Walter Lantz comics, co-creator of Fethry Duck), dies at age 70 or 71.

June 
 June 4: Sol Brodsky, American comics artist and Marvel Comics' production manager. Also known as Stan Lee's "right-hand man", passes away at age 61.
 June 10: Rodolfo Claro, aka Mico, aka René Foly, Argentine comics artist and illustrator, passes away at age 82.
 June 12: Bill Wright, American comics artist (Disney comics), dies at age 66.
 June 28: Pete Costanza, American comics artist (Captain Marvel), passes away at age 71.

July 
 July 14: Josep Coll i Coll, aka José Coll y Coll, Spanish comics artist (En Bufa i en Pumpun), commits suicide at age 61 with an electric cable in his bathtub.
 July 24: Bob Heinz, German comics artist (Pif und Alf, Jan Maat, Jerry der lustige Cowboy, Basil der Kätzenkonig, Bob Evans), dies at age 61.
 July 28: Henk Kabos, Dutch comics artist (Tekko Taks), passes away at age 71.
 July 29: Fred Waring, American bandleader, musician and comics collector (the Fred Waring Comics collection ), dies at age 84.

August 
 August 1: Howard Nostrand, American comics artist and illustrator (The comic strip based on the TV series Bat Masterson), dies at age 55.
 August 10: Virgil Partch, American cartoonist and comics artist (The Captain's Gig), dies at the age of 67 in a car accident, along with his wife.
 August 17: Bruno Premiani, Italian-American illustrator and comics artist (co-creator of Doom Patrol, worked on Tomahawk), dies at age 77.
 August 19: Don Newton, American comics artist (Batman, Captain Marvel), dies at age 49.
 August 21: Phil Seuling, American organizer of comic book fan conventions and father of the direct market, dies at age 50.
 August 28: Harry Lucey, American comics artist (Archie Comics), dies at age 70.

September 
 September 12: 
 Lola Anglada, Spanish comics artist and illustrator, dies at age 92.
 Rein Stuurman, Dutch illustrator and comics artist (Bobbeltje de Maankabouter, Gerrit de Zwarte Kraai, Jantje Puk), passes away at the age of 83.
 September 14: Lino Palacio, Argentine comics artist (Ramona, Don Fulgencio), dies at age 80.
 September 21: Hugh Stanley White, British comics artist (Rosalind and Tommy's Adventures Among the Chinese), dies at age 79. 
 September 25: Laverne Harding, American animator and comics artist (Walter Lantz, Hanna-Barbera, The Pink Panther), dies at age 78.

October
 October 21: Maurice Henry, French journalist, writer, poet, painter, film director, cartoonist and comics artist, dies at age 76.

November 
 November 14: Greg Irons, American underground cartoonist, animator, poster- and tattoo artist, is killed by a bus in Bangkok, Thailand, at age 37.
 November 30: 
 Francisco Flores Montes, Mexican comic artist and painter (Flyn de la Pradera, Capitán Wings, Flash el Vengador, El Noqueador del Barrio, Gitanillo, Mi Hermano Chuy, Angels Infernales), dies at age 64. 
 Frans Mettes, Dutch illustrator, poster- and comics artist (Het Huis Aan 't Water), dies at age 75.
 Specific date unknown: 
 Ben Oda, American comics letterer (EC Comics, DC Comics), dies at age 69.
 Brian White, British animator and comics artist (Nipper, continued Keyhole Kate), dies at age 82.

December 
 December 7: Otto Dicke, Dutch illustrator, cartoonist and comics artist (Spekkie en Blekkie, Jesje en Josje), dies at age 66.
 December 29: Erich Schmitt, German comic artist (Die Arche Noah), dies at age 60.  
 December 30: Mo Gollub, American comics artist (Disney comics, Hanna-Barbera), passes away at the age of 74.
 December 30: Al Avison, American comics artist (Captain America, Whizzer), dies at age 64.

Specific date unknown
 Guy Brasseur, Belgian comics artist and teacher (Scampi), dies at age 43 or 44.
 Will Gould, American comics artist (Red Barry), passes away at age 72 or 73.
 Guglielmo Guastaveglia, Italian journalist and comics artist (early Italian Mickey Mouse comics), dies at age 94 or 95.
 Giovanni Manca, Italian comics artist (Pier Cloruro de' Lambicchi, Macarietto, Don Gradasso Sbudelloni, Tamarindo), dies at age 94 or 95.

Exhibitions and shows 
 Summer: Gimpel Fils (London, England, U.K.) — "Strip Language: An Exploration of Representation and Comment, Serial Image and Text", curated by Caryn Faure Walker. Artists in the original art exhibition include Terry Atkinson, Sonia Boyce, Ruth Blench, Daniel Brandley, Eddie Campbell, Sue Coe, Robert Combas, Riana Duncan, Myra Hancock, Clifford Harper, Peter Kennard, Holly Metz, Gary Panter, Savage Pencil, Ian Pollack, Art Spiegelman, Oscar Zarate, Hollis Zigler

Conventions
 Creation Entertainment convention (Omni Hotel, Atlanta, Georgia) — guests include Walter Koenig, Butch Guice, and Bob Layton
 Spring:  Atlanta Comics Festival (Atlanta, Georgia) — co-organized by Glenwood Distributors and Marvel Comics; featured the Jim Shooter Roast, with guests Jim Shooter, John Byrne, Bob Layton, Bob McLeod, Mark Gruenwald, and John Romita Jr. 
 May 5: Portsmouth Mini-Con (Howard Johnson's, Portsmouth, New Hampshire ) — guests include Kevin Eastman & Peter Laird, and the debut of Teenage Mutant Ninja Turtles
 June: Heroes Convention (Charlotte, North Carolina) — guest: Stan Lee
 June 2: London Comic Mart (Central Hall, Westminster, UK) — guests include John Ridgway, Gary Russell, and Richard Marson
 June 23–24: Colorado Comic Art Convention (Auraria Campus Student Center, Denver, Colorado) — guests include Bill Sienkiewicz, Joe Kubert, Ed Stein, and Drew Litton
 June 28–July 1: San Diego Comic-Con (Convention and Performing Arts Center and Hotel San Diego, San Diego, California) — 5,500 attendees; official guests: Greg Bear, Howard Chaykin, Stan Drake, Burne Hogarth, Greg Jein, Ollie Johnston, Bob Layton, Brant Parker, Marshall Rogers, Mike Royer, Robert Shayne, Dave Stevens, Curt Swan, Frank Thomas, and Al Williamson. The Con is held earlier than usual due to the Los Angeles Summer Olympics. Sergio Aragonés hosts the Masquerade.
 July 6–8: Chicago Comicon (Ramada O'Hare, Rosemont, Illinois) — convention moves from Chicago to northern suburb of Rosemont; c. 12,000 attendees
 July 6–8: Dallas Fantasy Fair (Dallas, Texas) — guests include Mike W. Barr, Kerry Gammill, Fred Saberhagen, Kenneth Smith, Jim Starlin, Roger Zelazny, and Philip José Farmer
  August 3–5: Atlanta Fantasy Fair (Omni Hotel & Georgia World Congress Center, Atlanta, Georgia) —  3-day membership: $25; official guests include Larry Niven, Forrest J Ackerman, Robert Bloch, Sharon Webb, Richard Pini, Peter Laird, Kevin Eastman, Fred Hembeck
 September 22–23: OrlandoCon (Orlando, Florida) — guests include Will Eisner
 September 23: King Kon Comic & Fantasy Convention (Eastern Michigan University McKenny Union, Ypsilanti, MI) — inaugural show; guests include Dave Sim, Bill Willingham, William Messner-Loebs, Fred Schiller, Mike Gustovich, Mike Vosberg, Keith Pollard, Bob McLeod, Jeff Dee, and Tom Morgan
 November: Mid-Ohio Con (Mansfield, Ohio)
 November 23–25: Creation '84 (Omni Park Central Hotel, New York City)

Awards

Eagle Awards 
Presented in 1985 for comics published in 1984:
 Best New Title: Power Pack, written by Louise Simonson (Marvel Comics)
 Best Group Book: The New Teen Titans, written by Marv Wolfman (DC Comics)
 Best Character: Torquemada, from Nemesis the Warlock (2000 AD), by Pat Mills and Brian Talbot (Fleetway)
 Best UK Title: Warrior, edited by Dez Skinn (Quality Communications)
 Favourite Artist (UK): Alan Davis
 Roll of Honor: Steve Ditko

First issues by title

DC Comics 
Blue Devil
 Release: June. Writers: Dan Mishkin and Gary Cohn. Artist: Paris Cullins.

Infinity, Inc.
 Release: March. Writer: Roy Thomas. Artists: Jerry Ordway and Mike Machlan.

Legion of Super-Heroes vol. 3
 Release: August. Writer: Paul Levitz and Keith Giffen. Artists: Keith Giffen and Larry Mahlstedt.

New Teen Titans vol. 2
 Release: August. Writer: Marv Wolfman. Artist: George Pérez.

Star Trek
 Release: February. Writer: Mike W. Barr. Artists: Tom Sutton and Ricardo Villagran.

Marvel Comics 
Alien Legion
 Release: April by Epic Comics. Writers: Carl Potts and Alan Zelenetz. Artist: Frank Cirocco.

Amazing High Adventure
 Release: August. Editor: Carl Potts

Micronauts: The New Voyages
 Release: October cover. Writer: Peter B. Gillis. Artists: Kelley Jones and Bruce Patterson.

Power Pack
 Release: May (August cover). Writer: Louise Simonson. Artist: June Brigman.

Transformers
 Release: September. Writers: Ralph Macchio and Bill Mantlo. Artists: Frank Springer and Kim DeMulder.

Independent titles 
 Aztec Ace, by Eclipse Comics
Dragon Ball, by Akira Toriyama, first serialized on Weekly Shōnen Jump.
 Echo of Futurepast, by Continuity Comics
 Mister X, by Vortex Comics
 Mage: The Hero Discovered, by Comico Comics
 New Triumph, by Matrix Graphic Series
 Original Shield, by Archie Adventure Series
 Scream!, by IPC Magazines
Teenage Mutant Ninja Turtles, by Mirage Studios
 Wally Wood's T.H.U.N.D.E.R. Agents #1, by Deluxe Comics
 Zero Patrol #1, by Continuity Comics
 Zot!, by Scott McCloud, published by Eclipse Comics

Initial appearances by character name

DC Comics 
Big Sir in The Flash #338 (October)
 Bizarra, in DC Comics Presents #71 (July)
Blackbriar Thorn, in DC Comics Presents #66 (February)
Blue Devil, in The Fury of Firestorm #24 (June)
Bolt, in Blue Devil #6 (November)
 Crowbar, in Justice League of America #233 (December)
 Demolition Team, in Green Lantern #176 (May)
 Nathaniel Dusk, in Nathaniel Dusk #1 (February)
Cynthia Reynolds, in Justice League of America Annual #2 (October)
Javelin, in Green Lantern #173 (February)
 Jemm, in Jemm, Son of Saturn #1 (September)
Jericho, in New Teen Titans #42 (May)
Kid Devil in Firestorm #24 (June)
Louise Lincoln, in The Fury of Firestorm #21 (March)
Predator in Green Lantern #178 (July)
 Slipknot, in The Fury of Firestorm #28 (October)
 Felicity Smoak, in The Fury of Firestorm #23 (May)
Steel, in Justice League of America Annual #2
William Walsh in Tales of the Teen Titans #44 (July)
 Tezcatlipoca, in Wonder Woman #314 (April)
 Tsunami, in All-Star Squadron #33 (May)
Vibe, in Justice League of America Annual #2
 Wrath, in Batman Special #1 (1984)
Hardline in Justice League of America #233 (December)
Windfall in Batman and the Outsiders #9 (April)
Midnight in All-Star Squadron #31 (March)
Red Torpedo in All-Star Squadron #31 (March)
Geode in Batman and the Outsiders #9 (April)
Overmaster in Justice League of America #233 (December)
Barracuda in World's Finest #304 (June)
Shockwave in Blue Devil #2 (July)
Alan Welles in Vigilante #7 (June)
Richard Raleigh in All-Star Squadron #33 (May)
Paragon in Justice League of America #224 (March)
Nathaniel Dusk in Nathaniel Dusk #1 (February)
Major Victory in Batman and the Outsiders Annual #1 (September)
NoMan in T.H.U.N.D.E.R. Agents #2 (January)
Sparkler in Batman and the Outsiders Annual #1 (September)
Lady Liberty in Batman and the Outsiders Annual #1 (September)
Mayflower in Batman and the Outsiders Annual #1 (September)
Silent Majority in Batman and the Outsiders Annual #1 (September)
Neon the Unknown in All-Star Squadron #31 (March)
Scyla in Sun Devils #1 (July)

Marvel Comics 
 Aquarius (Zachary Drebb), in Iron Man #184 (July)
 Aries IV, in Iron Man #184 (July)
 Autobots, in The Transformers #1 (September)
Bluestreak
Brawn
Bumblebee
 Cliffjumper
Gears
Huffer
 Ironhide
Jazz
Mirage
 Optimus Prime
 Prowl
Ratchet
 Sideswipe
Sparkplug
Sunstreaker
Trailbreaker
Wheeljack
Windcharger
 The Beyonder, in Secret Wars #1 (May)
 Lila Cheney, in New Mutants Annual #1
 Decepticons, in The Transformers #1 (September)
Buzzsaw
Frenzy
Laserbeak
 Megatron
 Ravage
Rumble
Skywarp
Soundwave
Starscream
Thundercracker
 Forge, in Uncanny X-Men #184 (August)
 Madison Jeffries, in Alpha Flight #16 (November)
 Amiko Kobayashi, in Uncanny X-Men #181 (May)
 Kurse (as the Dark Elf Algrim the Strong), Thor #347 (September)
 Leech, in Uncanny X-Men #179 (March)
 Magus, in New Mutants #18 (August)
 Ogun, in Kitty Pryde and Wolverine #1 (November)
 Power Pack, in Power Pack #1 (August)
 Alex Power
 Jack Power
 James Power
 Julie Power
 Katie Power
 Margaret Power
 Puma, in The Amazing Spider-Man #256 (September)
 Nathaniel Richards, in Fantastic Four #272 (November)
 Rose, in The Amazing Spider-Man #253 (June)
 Sin, in Captain America #290 (February)
 Spider-Woman (Julia Carpenter), in Secret Wars #6 (October)
 Spot, in Spectacular Spider-Man #97 (December)
 Titania, in Secret Wars #3 (July)
 Venom (as the "alien costume"), in The Amazing Spider-Man #252 (May)
 Walrus, in Defenders #131 (May)
 Warlock, in New Mutants #18 (August)
 Warpath, in New Mutants #16 (June)

Mirage Studios 
 Foot Clan, in Teenage Mutant Ninja Turtles #1 (May)
 Hamato Yoshi, in Teenage Mutant Ninja Turtles #1 (May)
 Shredder, in Teenage Mutant Ninja Turtles #1 (May)
 Splinter, in Teenage Mutant Ninja Turtles #1 (May)
 Teenage Mutant Ninja Turtles, in Teenage Mutant Ninja Turtles #1 (May)
 Donatello
 Leonardo
 Michelangelo
 Raphael
 April O'Neil, in Teenage Mutant Ninja Turtles #2 (October)

Independent titles 
 Bulma, in Dragon Ball Ch. 1  (Weekly Shōnen Jump  December 3 issue, Shueisha)
 Chief Judge Fargo, in 2000 AD #377 (August 4 by IPC Media)
 Nightveil, in Nightveil #1 (AC Comics)
 Northguard, in New Triumph #1 (Matrix Graphic Series)
 Bucky O'Hare, in Echo of Futurepast #1 (Continuity Comics)
 Son Goku, in Dragon Ball Ch. 1 (Weekly Shōnen Jump  December 3 issue, Shueisha)
 Zachary T. Paleozogt, in Zot! #1 (April by Eclipse Comics)

References